Thomas Kilpatrick (born 1940), known as Tommy Scott, is a Scottish songwriter, producer and singer. As a songwriter and producer in the 1960s and '70s he had numerous hits in pop, rock, and folk styles; including records with Them, The Dubliners, Sydney Devine, Twinkle, and Lena Zavaroni.
From the 1980s onwards he has sung and recorded traditional Scottish music.

Biography
Scott worked in Glasgow's shipyards, before a musical career which has included touring with The White Heather Club and Jimmy Shand, and recordings including total sales of over a million.

An early success was Eden Kane's 1964 hit single "Boys Cry" (UK #8), written by Scott and Buddy Kaye. A French version, "Les Garçons Pleurent (Boys Cry)", was a #5 hit for Richard Anthony.

In the mid-1960s in London, Scott began producing for Decca Records' Dick Rowe, and worked closely with manager Phil Solomon and writer/arranger Phil Coulter. At Decca, Scott produced two albums by Them, featuring Van Morrison, but not their hit singles, which were produced by Rowe, or Bert Berns.

The 1966 song "I Can Only Give You Everything", written with Coulter and produced for Them, has become a garage rock staple; with covers by The Troggs, MC5, Richard Hell, and many others. Beck played the signature guitar riff for his hit song "Devils Haircut" (1996), and gave co-credit to Scott and Coulter.

He became a house producer for Solomon’s Major Minor Records, and formed the 'Scott Solomon' production company with him.

In 1968 he and conductor Arthur Greenslade teamed up as the 'Artie Scott Orchestra', issuing one album, and the novelty single "March of the Skinheads" (1970).

In 1976 Scott collaborated with Tom Parker of Apollo 100 as the 'Plaid Pops Orchestra', recording their own Scottish themed tunes.

Sydney Devine had a hit in 1978 with "Scotland Forever", written and produced by Tommy Scott. By the 1980s Scott turned his efforts to performing and recording traditional Scottish music on the Scotdisc label, and his own songs, including "Scotland Forever".

Selective discography

Singles

Albums/Album tracks

References

Sources

Heylin, Clinton (2003). Can You Feel the Silence? Van Morrison: A New Biography, Chicago Review Press 
Rogan, Johnny (2006). Van Morrison: No Surrender, London:Vintage Books 
 officialcharts.com UK Charts search
 Irish Charts search
 Tommy Scott discography at discogs.com

1940 births
Living people
Scottish songwriters
Scottish record producers